Giovanni Domenico Rebiba (died 6 February 1604) was a Catholic prelate who served as Bishop of Catania (1595–1604) and Bishop of Ortona (1570–1595).

Biography
On 8 November 1570, Giovanni Domenico Rebiba  was appointed during the papacy of Pope Pius V as Bishop of Ortona. On 19 November 1570, he was consecrated bishop by Scipione Rebiba, Cardinal-Priest of Santa Maria in Trastevere, with Nicola Perusco, Bishop of Civita Castellana e Orte, and Francesco Rusticucci, Bishop of Fano, serving as co-consecrators. On 11 December 1595, he was appointed during the papacy of Pope Clement VIII as Bishop of Catania. He served as Bishop of Catania until his death on 6 February 1604.

References

External links and additional sources
 (for Chronology of Bishops) 
 (for Chronology of Bishops) 

16th-century Italian Roman Catholic bishops
17th-century Italian Roman Catholic bishops
Bishops appointed by Pope Pius V
Bishops appointed by Pope Clement VIII
1604 deaths